Gymnopleurus gemmatus, is a species of dung beetle found in India, and Sri Lanka.

Description
This oval, less convex species has an average length of about 6 to 9 mm. Body blackish with minute grey setae on dorsum. There are shining bare patches upon the pronotum, a central spot and parts of elytra, and sutural margins. There is a common transverse irregular patch located at the middle as well as a smaller common patch located behind it just before the apices. Head densely granular and clypeus with two blunt lobes in front. Pronotum granular. Elytra irregularly rugose, finely striate, and very deeply excised at the sides. Pygidium closely punctured.

References 

Scarabaeinae
Insects of Sri Lanka
Insects of India
Insects described in 1871
Taxa named by Edgar von Harold